Heliozela limbata is a moth of the family Heliozelidae. It was described by Lee, Hirowatari and Kuroko in 2006 and is endemic to Japan (Honshu and Kyushu).

The forewings are blackish fuscous with brassy reflections. The hindwings are brown with brassy reflections.

The larvae feed on Quercus serrata. They mine the leaves of their host plant.

References

External links

Moths described in 2006
Endemic fauna of Japan
Heliozelidae
Moths of Japan